This is a list of the main career statistics of professional Belgian tennis player Yanina Wickmayer.

Performance timelines

Only main-draw results in WTA Tour, Grand Slam tournaments, Fed Cup/Billie Jean King Cup and Olympic Games are included in win–loss records.

Singles
Current after the 2022 Korea Open.

Doubles

WTA career finals

Singles: 11 (5 titles, 6 runner-ups)

Doubles: 5 (3 titles, 2 runner-ups)

WTA Challenger finals

Singles: 2 (1 title, 1 runner-up)

Doubles: 4 (1 title, 3 runner-ups)

ITF Circuit finals

Singles: 22 (12 titles, 10 runner–ups)

Doubles: 25 (15 titles, 10 runner–ups)

Top 10 wins

Notes

References

Wickmayer, Yanina